Camilo Nogueira Román (born 22 November 1936) is a Spanish politician and engineer. He was a Member of the European Parliament between 1999 and 2004. He was part of the Galician Nationalist Bloc (BNG) and the Democratic Party of the Peoples of Europe, which took part in the Greens–European Free Alliance.

Nogueira finished his studies in industrial engineering in 1964, and graduated with a degree in economics in 1975. He worked as an engineer for Citroën in Vigo between 1964 and 1972. After that he became the Projects and Development Director of the Society for the Industrial Development of Galicia (SODIGA) between 1973 and 1987. Nogueira has always been actively involved in politics.

As a politician, he was a member of the executive board of UPG/ANPG (Galician People's Union) from 1970–1977, and member of the executive board of the PSG-EG (Galician Socialist Party) from 1977–1996. He was the leader of Unidade Galega (Galician Unity), a political party which eventually integrated in the BNG coalition. He was a member of the executive board of BNG from 1996 to 1999.

At present he is member of the municipal council of his birth city of Vigo and Deputy in the Galician Parliament representing the BNG.

Nogueira is author of a number of publications on economics and politics in connection with the "Galician Question" (issues related to or having to do with Galicia).

In  European Parliament, Camilo Nogueira was very active. His posts while he was a member of the European Parliament were:

 Committee on Regional Policy, Transport and Tourism, Member
 Committee on Constitutional Affairs, Substitute
 Committee on Fisheries, Substitute
 Delegation for relations with the United States, Member

Nogueira made headlines when, following the example of José Posada, he made his oral and written communications in Galician at the European chamber, and this was accepted as a variety of Portuguese. Since then, he has been considered a reintegrationist and was offered honorary membership of the AGAL (Galician Association of the Language), which he accepted.

References 

Living people
1936 births
Galician Nationalist Bloc MEPs
MEPs for Spain 1999–2004
Members of the 1st Parliament of Galicia
Members of the 2nd Parliament of Galicia
Members of the 3rd Parliament of Galicia
Members of the 5th Parliament of Galicia